Franz Seraph von Dietrichstein (22 August 1570 – 19 September 1636), of the Austrian and Moravian House of Dietrichstein, was Prince of Dietrichstein, Archbishop of Olomouc, Governor (Landeshauptmann) of Moravia and a Cardinal.

Early life

Dietrichstein was born on 22 August 1570 in Madrid, the 8th of 12 children born to Adam von Dietrichstein, the Holy Roman Empire's then-ambassador to Spain.

He studied in Vienna and Prague. Then in 1588, at age 18, he moved to Rome to study at the Collegium Germanicum. While in Rome be befriended Cardinal Ippolito Aldobrandini who was elected pope in 1592 and took the name Pope Clement VIII. Dietrichstein became the new pope's chamberlain and worked to represent the interests of his native Bohemia as canon of the cathedral chapters of Olomouc, Wroclav, Passau and Leitmeritz.

Cardinalate

Dietrichstein was ordained in 1597 and then elevated to cardinal only two years later, in 1599, with an appointment as cardinal-priest of San Silvestro in Capite. In May of that same year he was elected as Archbishop of Olomouc, though his election was opposed by members of the local cathedral chapter. He was consecrated by the pope himself, with special dispensation for having not reached canonical age (he was only 29 at the time). According to historian Ludwig von Pastor, Dietrichstein became the, "soul of all Catholic undertakings in Moravia". It was apparently due to Dietrichstein's zeal that protestant reformer Karl von Zierotin was forced into early retirement.

He was unable to participate in the papal conclave of March 1605 but he did take part in the conclave of May 1605 which elected Pope Paul V. In 1607 he returned again to Bohemia as President of Emperor Rudolf II's privy council.

Thirty Years' War

At the outbreak of the Bohemian Revolt and the Thirty Years' War, in 1618, Dietrichstein fled to Vienna but returned after Emperor Ferdinand II's decisive victory at the Battle of White Mountain and was appointed Governor of Moravia from 1621 to 1628. Due to the ongoing conflict he did not participate in either the 1621 or 1623 papal conclaves.

He became responsible for implementing the Counter-Reformation in Bohemia and surrounding regions and for mediating internal Habsburg disputes.

In 1624, he was elevated as Fürst (Prince) von Dietrichstein zu Nikolsburg, a title he could pass on to his nephew Maximilian and his descendants.

In 1635, he was banished from court and his possessions were confiscated, but the dispute was resolved later that year, his properties and titles were restored and he was appointed Cardinal-protector of the Holy Roman Empire. The following year he was appointed Imperial governor in Moravia, Bohemia and Lower Austria.

Death 
Franz von Dietrichstein died in September 1636 at the age of 66 in Brno (current Czech Republic).

Ancestry

References

1570 births
1636 deaths
Austrian princes
Bohemian nobility
Archbishops of Olomouc
Spanish Roman Catholic archbishops